A pop-up camper is a type of towed recreational vehicle that can be collapsed for easy storage and transport. When set up, this type of trailer provides a large amount of interior space when compared to its size when collapsed. Its relatively affordable price makes it a popular choice for some RVers and its small size contributes to easier towing than many other types of RVs.

Features

A conventional pop-up consists of a trailer frame, a box, a hard roof, pull-out bunks and "soft" walls. The walls are made of vinyl, canvas, or a similar material, and include windows with screens.

Basic popups usually include the following features: fold-down dinette (table top and bench seating combination), on-board fresh water tank, sink, 12-volt DC power system (including an AC to DC converter and a deep cycle battery), interior DC lighting, two sleeping bunks and storage cabinets. Many pop-ups also include a gas or electric absorption refrigerator, stove, rooftop air conditioner, propane furnace, water heater, electric water pump, exterior shower, skylight or roof vent, one or two propane tanks, electric or surge brakes, large storage trunk at the front of the box, and an awning. Some premium models also include a shower, toilet, wastewater tanks, slide-out section (to increase interior space), microwave, and an oven.

Since space is at a premium in popup campers, it is common for a single structure to serve multiple purposes. Generally, the dinette, which can seat four people for a meal, can be converted into a bed to provide additional sleeping space. Likewise, the couch, if present, can usually be folded down into a bed. Often, the inside table (part of the dinette) and the gas stove can be taken outside and attached to the side of the camper.

Dimensions
When opened, the length is roughly double the box length. Published sleeping capacities range from 4 to 8 people.

Setting up

To open a pop-up, the trailer must be chocked, disconnected from the tow vehicle, and leveled. The roof must first be raised using a winch that extends telescoping poles on each corner of the box. Next, bunks at the front and the back of the trailer are pulled out by hand. Then, the tent material (which is fastened to the box and to the roof) is unfurled, pulled over the ends of the bunks, and attached. Interior support poles for the bunk and the entry door are then installed.

Depending on the configuration and included equipment, several additional set up steps may be required. These steps include hooking up to utilities (electricity, water, sewer), reassembling the dinette, unfolding the sink, turning on systems (water pump, water heater, etc.), making beds and unpacking belongings.

Setup time for a pop-up camper is typically longer than that for a travel trailer, fifth wheel or motorhome.

Types of pop-ups

In addition to the traditional pop-up campers described above, there are a number of special types of pop-ups on the market:
 High wall pop-ups  Feature a taller box which allows for residential-height countertops and more storage space.
 Motorcycle campers  Lightweight pop-ups small enough to be pulled by a motorcycle. 
 Toyhauler pop-ups  Include an open cargo deck for transporting ATVs, motorcycles, etc. 
 Off-road pop-ups Feature rugged construction and raised suspension for off road use.
 A-frame  small solid wall folding camper.
 Flip-out camper  Features a roof which flips over to become a bunk. Uses a tent roof instead of a hard roof.
 Inflatable trailer Sets up quickly by blowing compressed air into side walls and roof

Gallery

See also

 Caravan (trailer)
 Recreational travel
 Recreational Vehicle
 Rooftop tent
 Trailer
 Travel trailer

References
Notes

Sources

External links
 PopUpPortal - The Definitive Source for PopUp and Hybrid Camper Owners
 Great Lakes Pop Up Club
 PopupCamperHistory Website

Caravans and travel trailers